Pannonian Rusyn, also historically referred to as Yugoslav Rusyn, is a variety of the Rusyn language, spoken by the Pannonian Rusyns, primarily in the regions of Vojvodina (northern part of modern Serbia) and Slavonia (eastern part of modern Croatia), and also in Pannonian Rusyn diaspora in the United States and Canada. Since Rusyns are officially recognized as a national minority both in Serbia and Croatia, their language is also recognized as a minority language, and in the Autonomous Province of Vojvodina (Serbia) it is employed as one of six official provincial languages.  

In some non-Slavic languages, Pannonian Rusyns may be referred to by somewhat archaic exonyms, such as Pannonian Ruthenes or Pannonian Ruthenians, and their language is thus labeled as Pannonian Ruthenian, but such terminology is not used in the native (Rusyn) language. Ruthenian exonyms are also viewed as imprecise, since they have several broader meanings, both in terms of their historical uses and ethnic scopes, that are encompassing various East Slavic groups and their languages.

There are several scholarly debates on various linguistic issues related to this language, including the question whether Pannonian Rusyn should be reclassified as a distinct microlanguage, or still considered to be just a specific variety of the common Rusyn language, that also has other varieties, spoken by Rusyns in northern (Carpathian) regions, mainly in southwestern Ukraine, northeastern Slovakia, southeastern Poland, and northern Romania.

Name

Most commonly, native speakers refer to their language simply as Rusky ( / ), that renders in English as Rusyn. Sometimes they also use the somewhat archaic term Rusnacky ( / ), that renders in English as Rusnak. These terms are used both by laypersons in daily conversation, and by Pannonian-Rusyn linguists in native-language scholarly works.

Since those terms have historically been (and still are) used by Carpathian Rusyns and other East Slavs as endonyms for their own vernacular, a need emerged for an appropriate adjective to identify this particular linguistic variety. In this spirit, Gabriel Kostelnik proposed the term  to refer to the language spoken in the region of Bačka (modern-day Serbia).

Eventually, the more general term, was adopted by several scholars and thus also encompassed the varieties of the language spoken in the region of Srem (modern-day Serbia and Croatia). Terms such as Vojvodina Rusyn or Vojvodinian Rusyn were alternatively used to refer to all variants in the region of Vojvodina. Even wider term Yugoslav Rusyn was sometimes also used during the existence of former Yugoslavia.        

Finally, during the 1970s and 1980s, Rusyn writer and artist Yulian Kolyesarov proposed the term Panonsko-Rusky or Pannonian Rusyn.

In spite of all the aforementioned endonymic tems, some modern authors still opt to use those based on the exonymic term Ruthenian. Since native speakers do not use Ruthenian or related terms for self-identification in their own language, such terms are likewise not used in works written in the native language. Still, the terms are employed by some authors in various English-language and non-Slavic works; sometimes in a very general manner. For instance, instead of using regional identifiers (such as Pannonian Ruthenian, corresponding to Pannonian Rusyn), several of these authors have begun to simply designate that linguistic variety solely as Ruthenian, excluding any regional or other adjectives.   

Thus, a peculiar terminological situation has emerged as the term Ruthenian language already has a specific and well-established meaning in both traditional and scientific contexts and primarily refers to late medieval and early modern varieties of East Slavic as were spoken in the regions of modern-day Ukraine, Belarus from the 15th until 18th centuries. More recently in the former Austro-Hungarian Monarchy, the corresponding term was employed until 1918 as the official exonymic term for the entire body of East Slavic languages within the borders of the Monarchy.

ISO 639-3 Identifier
On January 20, 2020, the ISO 639-3 identifier, rsk, and language names, Rusyn and Ruthenian, were approved for Pannonian Rusyn by ISO. The change followed a November 2020 request by a group of linguists (including Aleksandr Dulichenko) in which ISO was asked to recognize Pannonian Rusyn as distinct and separate from Carpathian Rusyn and to issue it the new ISO 639-3 identifier, Ruthenian language (with the additional name, Rusnak).

This ISO update is the latest development since a 2019 proposal from a smaller group of those same linguists which similarly requested suppression of the code, rue, and division of Rusyn language into two distinct languages: the East Rusyn language (Carpathian Rusyn) and the South Rusyn language (Pannonian Rusyn). However, in January 2020, ISO authorities rejected the request.

As explained earlier, term Ruthenian language already has a specific and well-established meaning. However, the additional term, Rusnak, also has a wider connotation as it is a traditional endonym for all Rusyns (whether in Pannonia or Carpathian Rus'). The effects of the adoption of these terms for Pannonian Rusyn by ISO (if any) remain to be seen.

Classification
Pannonian Rusyn has recently been treated as a separate language from Carpatho-Rusyn. By some scholars, mainly American scholars, Pannonian Rusyn has been treated as a West Slavic language, and Carpatho-Rusyn as an East Slavic language, which would make Pannonian Rusyn the only West Slavic language to use the Cyrillic script.

In the ISO 639-9 identifier application for Pannonian Rusyn (or "Ruthenian" as it is referred to in that document), the authors note that "Ruthenian is closest to [a] linguistic entity sometimes called [; ], ... (the speeches of Trebišov and Prešov [districts])."

Though Pannonian Rusyn shares most of its linguistic features with these Eastern Slovak dialects, it shares nine features which are exclusive to South-West Zemplin (Trebišov) Eastern Slovak varieties:

 Reflexes *ĕ (e.g. ;);

 Reflexes *ḷ (e.g. ;);

 Distribution o < *ō/*ŏ (e.g. ;);

 The distribution of e < *ē/*ě (e.g. ;);

 Change of *s > sh/ш and *z > zh/ж and the absence of phonemes ś and ź (e.g. ;);

 The presence of hard consonant groups shch/щ and zhdzh/ждж (e.g. ;);

 The dative and the locative singular forms of feminine nouns with the ending -a in the nominative singular form (e.g. ;);

 Infinitive endings and final -chits/-чиц;

 Lexical elements (e.g. ; kukovka/куковка "cuckoo”,).

Pannonian Rusyn also shares three features unique to South-East Šariš (Prešov) Eastern Slоvаk varieties:

 The presence of certain forms of the auxiliary verb  (e.g. ; ; etc.) and the formation of negative forms (e.g. ; ; etc.);

 Formation of masculine singular participle with the formant -l/-л for the verbs having the infinitive base in consonant (e.g.  ) and forms in the final -nul/-нул (e.g.);

 Lexical elements (e.g.).

Dulichenko аlsо states that East Slovaк features predominate both and on phonological and morphological level. He points to the following phonological features:

 Stress in Ruthenian is always on penultimate syllable; Dulichenko connects this feature with Polish, although it is present in all Eastern Slovak speeches;

 Initial e > ie/є (e.g. ;);

 i = y/и = ы (e.g. ; ;);

 dj > dz (e.g. ;); tj > c (ts) (e.g. ;);

 z' > (ź) > zh/ж (e.g. ; ; boiazhl'ivi/бояжлїви "afraid"); s' > (ś) > sh/ш (e.g. ;);

 The Proto-Slavic consonant groups *dl and *tl are preserved (e.g. zubadlo/зубадло "(artificial) teeth", ; ; stretla/стретла "she met");

 gvi > hvi (e.g.); kvi > kvi (e.g.);

 Absence of epenthesis l'/л (е.g. ;).
 Proto-Slavic groups -ort and -olt became groups rot- and lot- (e.g. ;);
 The below Protoslavic groups changed in the same manner as in West and South Slavic languages. In contrast, these groups became torot, tolot, teret, tolot (e.g. boroda, poroch, korova; holova, boloto, holod; bereh, pered, vereteno; moloko, polot', polova) in East Slavic languages.
 tort became trat (e.g. ;);
 tolt became tlat (e.g. ;);
 tert became tret (e.g. ;);
 telt became tlet (e.g. ;).

Dulichenko also notes that Pannonian Rusyn shares the following morphological features with East Slovak dialects:

 The nominative singular of nouns of neuter gender on a soft stem is formed by the ending -o (e.g.;);

 The instrumental singular of nouns of feminine gender is formed by the ending -u/-у (e.g.);

 The genitive plural and locative plural (vocative plural for nouns pertaining to animate thing) of nouns are formed by the ending -okh/-ох (e.g. [shpiv] ptitsokh/[шпив] птицох "singing of birds", [brekh] psokh/[брех] псох "barking of dogs");

 The dative plural of nouns formed by the ending -om/-ом (e.g. gu bradlom/ґу брадлом "to the heaps", vel'о);

 The instrumental plural ending: a) of adjectives (e.g.); b) of possessive, interrogative, demonstrative and personal pronouns of the third person plural (e.g.;);

 The nominative plural ending -o a) of possessive pronouns (e.g.); b) of possessive adjectives (e. g. shestrino chustochki/шестрино хусточки "sister's kerchiefs);

 The ending -m/-м for the first person singular of the Present Tense (e.g.;);

 The ending -me/-ме for the first person plural of the Present Tense (e.g.;);

 The endings -a, -'a, -u, -'u/-а, -я, -у, -ю for the third person plural of the Present Tense (e.g.);

 The reflexive particle she/ше is weakly related to a verb and can proceed it (e.g.);

 The system of forms of the auxiliary verb buts (som, shi, ie, zme, stse, su)/буц (сом, ши, є, зме, сце, су);

 The conjunction zhe/же in the dependent clause (e.g. ia znam zhe …/я знам же ... "I know that ...").

Classification as West Slavic 

Both Pannonian Rusyn and Carpathian Rusyn are East Slavic languages. Pannonian Rusyn differs from Carpathian Rusyn in that the former has been influenced by the surrounding South Slavic languages (especially Serbian), whilst the latter has been influenced by the surrounding West Slavic languages (especially Polish and Slovak).

Among the West Slavic languages, Rusyn has been especially influenced by the Eastern Slovak dialects. This influence occurred before the Rusyns emigrated to Pannonia from the north Carpathian area, around the middle of the 18th century.

Education 
In former Yugoslavia, Rusyns were recognized as a distinct national minority, with rights that included education in their own language. Their legal status was regulated in Yugoslav federal units of Serbia and Croatia. In the Constitution of Serbia, that was adopted on 9 April 1963, Rusyns were designated as one of seven (explicitly named) national minorities (Article 82), and by the Constitutional Law of 21 February 1969, Rusyn language was confirmed as one of five official languages in the Autonomous Province of Vojvodina (Article 67).

Consequently, a Rusyn language high school was established in Ruski Krstur (Руски Керестур,  / ), the cultural centre of the Pannonian Rusyns. At least 250 Rusyn language books have been printed so far for the high school and elementary schools in the region.)

There is a professorial chair in Rusyn Studies at Novi Sad University.

Media

There are regular television and radio programmes in Pannonian Rusyn, including the multilingual radio station Radio Novi Sad, which serves all of Vojvodina. The breakdown of minutes of Novi Sad original broadcasting by language in 2001 was: 23.5% Serbian, 23.5% Hungarian, 5.7% Slovak, 5.7% Romanian, 3.8% Rusyn, 2.2% Romani, and 0.2% Ukrainian.

Grammar and alphabet

Pannonian Rusyn was codified by Mikola Kočiš in Правопис руского язика (Pravopis ruskoho jazika; "Orthography of Rusyn", 1971) and Ґраматика руского язика (Gramatika ruskoho jazika; "Grammar of Rusyn", 1974) and is written in a Cyrillic script.

{| cellpadding=5 style="font-size:larger; text-align:center;" summary="The thirty-five letters of the Pannonian Rusyn alphabet, capital and small"
|+ style="font-size:smaller;" | The Pannonian Rusyn alphabet
|-
| А а || Б б || В в || Г г || Ґ ґ || Д д || Е е || Є є
|-
| Ж ж || З з || И и || Ї ї || Й й || К к || Л л || М м
|-
| Н н || О о || П п || Р р || С с || Т т || У у || Ф ф
|-
| Х х || Ц ц || Ч ч || Ш ш || Щ щ || Ю ю || Я я || Ь ь
|}

The Pannonian Rusyn alphabet has 32 letters. It includes all the letters of the Ukrainian alphabet except І/і. Like the Carpathian Rusyn alphabets, and like the Ukrainian alphabet until 1990, the Pannonian Rusyn alphabet places ь after я, while the vast majority of Cyrillic alphabets place ь before э (if present), ю, and я.

Comparison with the Carpathian Rusyn alphabets

The Prešov Rusyn alphabet of Slovakia has 36 letters. It includes all the letters of the Pannonian Rusyn alphabet plus ё, і, ы, and ъ.

The Lemko Rusyn alphabet of Poland has 34 letters. It includes all the letters of the Pannonian Rusyn alphabet with the exception of ї, plus і, ы, and ъ.

In the Ukrainian alphabet, и precedes і and ї, and the Pannonian Rusyn alphabet (which doesn't have і) follows this precedent by placing и before ї. In the Prešov Rusyn alphabet, however, і and ї come before и, and likewise, і comes before и in the Lemko Rusyn alphabet (which doesn't have ї).

See also
 Old Ruthenian
 Carpathian Rusyn language
 Pannonian Rusyns
 Rusyn exonyms (Vojvodina)

Notes

References

Sources

External links

National Council of the Rusyn National Minority in Serbia

Languages of Serbia
Languages of Vojvodina
Languages of Croatia
West Slavic languages
Endangered diaspora languages
Pannonian Rusyns
Ethnic groups in Ukraine
Ukrainian dialects
Rusyn_language